CNAV Laymore was an auxiliary vessel of the Royal Canadian Navy and the Canadian Forces during World War II and the Cold War, converted to an oceanographic research vessel in 1966. The vessel was commissioned in 1945 as HMCS Laymore and served on the east coast of Canada. In 1946, the vessel was paid off and redesignated an naval auxiliary, given the prefix "CNAV" and transferred to the west coast. Laymore was taken out of service in 1977 and sold to private interests. Renamed Chilcotin Princess, the ship was used as a small coastal cargo vessel servicing smaller ports along the British Columbia Coast. In 1998, Chilcotin Princess was sold for use as a helicopter pad by the logging industry in British Columbia. The vessel was then brought to Namu, British Columbia, where Chilcotin Princess was left unattended.

Description
During World War II, Laymore was armed with one  naval gun and two  cannon.

Service history
The origin of Laymore is disputed by the sources. Macpherson & Barrie claim the ship was constructed at Kewaunee, Wisconsin while the Miramar Ship Index is unsure as to which ship Laymore was laid down as, believing it could possibly be FS-375 constructed by Sturgeon Bay Shipbuilding and Drydock Company at their yard in Sturgeon Bay, Wisconsin for the United States Army. The ship was transferred to the Royal Canadian Navy during World War II and was commissioned as HMCS Laymore on 12 June 1945. Laymore was stationed on the east coast of Canada and operated in a variety of roles including transporting goods, boom defence and the laying of moorings.

The ship was paid off on 17 April 1946 after the end of the war and transferred to the west coast of Canada in mid-1946. The vessel reentered service as a naval auxiliary and was given the new prefix "CNAV". The conversion to an oceanographic research vessel began on 2 August 1965, with Laymore re-entering service in March 1966 and reclassified with the hull symbol AGOR. In 1977, Laymore was taken out of service and put up for sale. The vessel was purchased by Coast Ferries of Vancouver on 29 March 1977 and converted to a small cargo ship. Renamed Chilcotin Princess, the ship was used to transport cargo and passengers between points on the northern end of Vancouver Island and places around Bella Bella and Bella Coola. Chilcotin Princess was used to transport frozen fish shipments from Namu, British Columbia. In 1987, the vessel underwent minor reconstruction, receiving a new superstructure that could accommodate twelve passengers in six deluxe staterooms, and included a dining room, three lounges and an open sunbridge. In 1998, Chilcotin Princess was sold to the logging industry for use as a helicopter pad. Chilcotin Princess registry was deleted in 1999 and the vessel was taken to Namu and laid up. The vessel became derelict and on the verge of sinking. The Canadian Coast Guard removed  of oily water from the vessel, later suing the owner of the vessel for costs incurred.

Citations

Sources
 
 
 
 
 
 
 
 
 
 

Auxiliary ships of the Royal Canadian Navy
Cold War naval ships of Canada